DH5-Alpha Cells are E. coli cells engineered by American biologist Douglas Hanahan to maximize transformation efficiency. They are defined by three mutations: recA1, endA1 which help plasmid insertion and lacZΔM15 which enables blue white screening. The cells are competent and often used with calcium chloride transformation to insert the desired plasmid. A study of four transformation methods and six bacteria strains showed that the most efficient one was the DH5 strain with the Hanahan method.

Mutations 
 The recA1 mutation is a single point mutation that replaces glycine 160 of the recA polypeptide with an aspartic acid residue in order to disable the activity of the recombinases and inactivate homologous recombination.
 The endA1 mutation inactivates an intracellular endonuclease to prevent it from degrading the inserted plasmid.

References 

Escherichia coli
Molecular biology